This list of bridges in Spain lists bridges of particular historical, scenic, architectural or engineering interest. Road and railway bridges, viaducts, aqueducts and footbridges are included.

Bridges of historical importance

Bridges of architectural importance

Major road and railway bridges 
This table presents the structures with spans greater than 100 meters (non-exhaustive list).

Notes and references 
 Notes

 "Bien de Interés Cultural" (in Spanish).

 

 Others references

See also 

 List of Roman bridges
 List of aqueducts in the Roman Empire
 Transport in Spain
 Rail transport in Spain
 Highways in Spain
 List of national roads in Spain
 Geography of Spain
 Puentes de Sevilla  - Bridges of Seville

External links

Further reading 
Magazine
 
 
 
Books
 
 
 
 
 

Spain

Bridges
Bridges